Thondimuthalum Driksakshiyum is a 2017 Indian Malayalam-language crime drama film directed by Dileesh Pothan and written by Sajeev Pazhoor. The film stars Fahadh Faasil and Suraj Venjaramoodu , with Nimisha Sajayan, Alencier Ley Lopez, Vettukili Prakash, and Sibi Thomas in supporting roles. Syam Pushkaran served as a creative director of the film. Bijibal composed the music and Rajeev Ravi handled the cinematography.

Thondimuthalum Driksakshiyum was produced on a budget of 65 million. The film was released on 30 June 2017 in Kerala. It received critical acclaim and was also a commercial success at the box office, grossing 179.3 million from Kerala alone The Hindu included the film in their "Top 5 Malayalam movies in 2017" and "The 25 best Malayalam films of the decade".

The film won three National Film Awards, two Kerala State Film Awards, four Filmfare Awards South, three South Indian International Movie Awards, eight Asianet Film Awards, six CPC Cine Awards, four Vanitha Film Awards, three Kerala Film Critics Association Awards, two Asiavision Awards and one at International Film Festival of Kerala.

Plot

The story follows a newly married inter-caste couple, Sreeja and Prasad, from Cherthala who move up north to Kasaragod. During a bus journey, Sreeja's gold chain gets stolen by a thief also called Prasad. He swallows the chain, but not before Sreeja notices it. He gets caught by the passengers, who take him to a nearby police station.  

On police inquiry, Prasad (thief) denies the act.  Police accompany him to the toilet the next morning but don't find any chain. Eventually, after an x-ray, the chain is found stuck inside his stomach. How to extract the chain, then, becomes the question. Next morning, he is again accompanied by the police to the toilet where he tries to run away. He was caught by Prasad (Sreeja's husband) near a canal and brought back to the police station. At the police station, he claims that a police officer called ASI Chandran had told him to run away after taking the chain. Prasad (thief) was again scanned for the chain and this time, there was no chain in his stomach. Finding his job in danger, ASI Chandran gives Sreeja another gold chain to settle the matter in a way that finds Prasad (thief) being guilty. 

Next day Sreeja falsely confesses that the chain found by police belongs to her and signs the document which claims that Prasad (thief) is guilty. In a momentary absence of police, Prasad convinces Sreeja and her husband that she should not lie and tells his sympathetic story. Prasad (thief) tells Sreeja that she should tell the court that the chain does not belong to her and tells her husband where he actually threw her gold chain. Sreeja's husband (Prasad) finds the chain.

In the end, Prasad is writing a thank you note to Sreeja presumably for telling the truth in the court which freed him.

Cast
 
Suraj Venjaramoodu as Prasad,a farmer
 Fahadh Faasil as Prasad, the thief
 Nimisha Sajayan as Sreeja (voice over by Srinda Arhaan)
 Alencier Ley Lopez as A.S.I Chandran
 Vettukili Prakash as Sreekandan, Sreeja's father
 Mini K. S. as Sreeja's mother
 Sibi Thomas as S.I Sajan Mathew
 Unnimaya Prasad as Thaatha, the woman in the bus
 Srikant Murali as Murali
 Senior Civil Police Officer Sadhanandan as Police Constable
 P. Sivadas as Police Writer
 K. T. Sudhakaran as Sudhakaran
 Shahi Kabir as Shahi
 K. T. Balachandran as Babu Sir
 Unniraj Chervathur as Rajesh Ambalathara
 Aravindan as Faizal
 Sarath Kovilakam as Sarath
 Shince Mathew

Production
Initially Pazhoor thought of directing the film himself, before Pothan came on-board. About the genre of the film, Pothen said that he is not sure which genre the film falls in, but it surely has the elements of a "family drama". For some of the police roles, the film features real-life police officers in the cast. Newcomer Nimisha Sajayan was selected from general auditions. Principal photography commenced from 7 December 2016 in Kasaragod. Other locations include Vaikom and Cherthala.

Music

The music and background score for the film is composed by Bijibal, who has previously worked with Dileesh Pothan in Maheshinte Prathikaaram.

Release
Thondimuthalum Driksakshiyum was released in India on 30 June 2017.

Critical reception
Critic Veeyen termed the movie has sardonic wisecracks and the continual cackles, which fundamentally holds the charm of an otherwise unexciting film. He closes of by signifying the exceptional intelligence and grace the film has in terms of flow.

Bharadwaj, in the review of the film, stated that "Fahadh Faasil's equal parts lazy and wily trickster acting and Alencier Ley Lopez's character acting as luminously exceptional." He praises on the beauty of police office politics that Dileesh & Sajeev was able to portray as the drive that calibrates the film. Manorama praises real-life police officer Sibi Thomas for his comedic and yet balanced performance.

Baradwaj Rangan of Film Companion South wrote "Simply put, Pothan’s films aren’t about the incidents suggested by the titles, but around them. Instead of zooming in, narratively speaking, he goes for the wide shot. This is a generous approach to filmmaking. It says that the main characters are a part of the world around them, and this world needs to be acknowledged as well."

Director Shekhar Kapur, jury chairman of 65th National Film Awards commented: "Brilliant film, impressive performance. First you will think it is a simple film with usual romance and elopement. But how subtle are the things introduced in the film? The movie takes a serious turn by the end, leaving you appalled. I have never seen such an excellent performance by actors,".

Box office 
Thondimuthalum Driksakshiyum has collected 50 million gross in the first weekend, in 50-days movie collected 173 million gross from Kerala box office. The film was a commercial success. It grossed 175 million from Kerala box office in its lifetime.

Accolades

References

External links
 

2017 films
2017 crime drama films
Indian crime drama films
2010s Malayalam-language films
Films about theft
Fictional portrayals of the Kerala Police
Films directed by Dileesh Pothan
Films scored by Bijibal
Films featuring a Best Supporting Actor National Film Award-winning performance
Films whose writer won the Best Original Screenplay National Film Award
Best Malayalam Feature Film National Film Award winners
Films shot in Kerala
Films shot in Alappuzha